Rebecca Sinclair may refer to:

 Rebecca Sinclair (author) (fl. 1980s–2000s), American romance novelist
 Rebecca Sinclair (snowboarder) (born 1991), New Zealand snowboarder
 Rebecca Rand Kirshner (born 1974), writer and producer for American television